Gerstner is a German surname. Notable people with the surname include:

Eli Gerstner (born 1980), American Orthodox Jewish singer/songwriter and producer
František Josef Gerstner (1756–1832), Czech railway engineer
František Antonín Gerstner (1795–1840), Czech railway engineer
Harry Gerstner (born 1884), American woodworker and founder of H. Gerstner & Sons
John Gerstner (1914–1996), Professor of Church History
Louis V. Gerstner, Jr. (born 1942), chairman of the board and CEO of IBM
Sascha Gerstner (born 1977), German musician and photographer
Siegfried Gerstner (1916–2013), German military officer and Knight's Cross recipient
Thomas Gerstner (born 1966), German football manager and player
Wulfram Gerstner, German and Swiss computational neuroscientist

See also
3887 Gerstner, main-belt asteroid

German-language surnames